Phyllodesmium opalescens is a species of sea slug, an aeolid nudibranch, a marine gastropod mollusc in the family Facelinidae.

Distribution 
The type locality of Phyllodesmium opalescens is Mirs Bay, Hong Kong. It has been reported from Korea and the Philippines.

Description 
This species grows to 20 mm in length. It does not sequester zooxanthellae.

Ecology 
The food of Phyllodesmium opalescens is unknown.

References

Facelinidae
Gastropods described in 1991